Empires & Allies is a defunct social network game that was Zynga's first combat and strategy game. The game, the first release by Zynga's Los Angeles studio, launched in twelve languages on June 1, 2011.  G4TV.com writer Jake Gaskill called the release the "biggest launch of any Zynga title to date". Empires & Allies became the fourth most popular game on Facebook within weeks after launch, reaching 33 million monthly active users by the third week of June. The game was a freemium game, meaning there was no cost to play but players had the option of purchasing premium content. The game was taken offline on June 17, 2013. On May 5, 2015, Empires & Allies was re-released worldwide on Apple's App Store and Google Play.

Empire Points
Empire Points are used to sell certain items.
Players get 15 empire points when starting the game and have to pay to get more.
Additional Empire Points can be purchased in-game, from Zynga's Website, via game cards from some local stores or by completing certain in-game goals.

Setting

Empires & Allies portrays a military cartoon world composed mostly of archipelagos with each player beginning with one island, and being able to expand to up to four other islands. Each archipelago represents an "empire" or militarized island nation, with a "world alliance" that the player can optionally enter, but by doing so forfeits an ability to attack other sovereign nations. The player's task is to recover their island nation's glory and defeat the main villain, "The Raven," and his commanders, who each have covered a separate archipelago that the player must island hop until the end of the "chain" which is the island that "The Raven" resides on.

The game begins with a massive enemy attack which all but demolishes the player's nation, in a quest for revenge, the player is dragged into a war against the aggressors, uncovering their reasoning for the attack. It is later revealed that the player's island contains a valuable ore that the enemy requires for a super weapon, which the player is tasked to stop at all costs. The player meets several advisors: a civic advisor, a military advisor, a construction advisor, and a mission advisor.

Empires & Allies has the distinction of being Zynga's first graphics based (as opposed to Mafia Wars, which is browser based) game to portray violence and modern warfare. Although the game still retains the graphical style of previous Zynga games such as CityVille and FarmVille, neither of said games portrayed military hardware. Despite all this, Empires & Allies still maintains good humor with enemy commanders having often comedic portrayals and biographies, such as "The Raven" being named such for he couldn't catch an eagle and instead settled on a raven.

Within nine days, Empires & Allies had gained nearly 10 million users.

Gameplay

Islands

Each player owns an archipelago of five islands (with only part of one in the beginning) that functions similar to homesteads in FrontierVille, cities in CityVille, and farms in FarmVille, operating as a main area for player customization, as well as the production of materials, money, and military units. A player can visit a friend's island, or they can optionally invade and pillage their island. An island, however, can be defended with placement of military units (who must be on the island in order to be considered "deployed") which defend a small to large square area around them.

Each island houses many buildings, with a population cap. Population caps are increased by building government buildings which must be filled by allies. Population determines the availability of certain units and buildings.

Invading and Defending

Unique to Empires & Allies is the option of player versus player combat. Players can optionally attack other players who are above level 6 in order to gain resources, infamy points or prize tokens. A player who successfully invades another player can claim an "invasion zone" which they can loot every twelve hours for resources until the target player or an ally of the target repels their invasion, or upon the activation of the player's "world embassy". The buildings in the invaded area generate resources and infamy points for the invader, depending on the building. For instance, an oil well yields oil; housing, farms, and government buildings yield coins; lumber mills yield wood; and mines yield ore. All buildings, except government buildings; which yields 3 infamy points, gives 2 infamy points after a successful invasion. In addition, the target player of the invasion must spend extra energy to perform any maintenance on invaded territory. A player can become immune to attacks if he/she establishes a World Embassy. However they also may not attack another player (or the Embassy will be rendered useless) and must surrender any and all invaded territory. When a player forfeits the effect of the World Embassy, they may not activate it for another six hours.

The "Battle Blitz" mode has the same effects as the invasions of neighboring empires. However, the player invades other players who are on the same level as them. A player who claims an invasion zone in Battle Blitz gets five prize tokens, which could be used to spin the wheel for prizes.

Units and Combat

Combat is initiated whenever a player attacks an AI commander during a campaign, attacks another player's island, or defends against an enemy player's invasion. Combat is turn based, and is not live. Instead, an invading player will combat another player's (or enemy AI commander's) military forces controlled by an AI. The player will always go first.

Combat begins with a 'deployment phase' in which a player can choose up to five units to use in combat. After the deployment phase, units enter the combat phase. Every unit has three strengths which are marked with "great target," with higher chances of critical hits (which produce resource, experience, and energy bonuses, as well as extra damage) if a unit attacks its specialty, this works in reverse effect, as a unit also has a weakness to any unit that shares its specialty. If a unit is of the same type as another, or is simply not directly related, they will have a "fair attack" in which they half an even chance of dealing normal damage as well as an even chance of a "glancing shot." If a unit attacks another unit which is strong towards it, it will be marked as a "poor target" which will usually produce a "glancing shot" with a 20% chance of producing a standard attack. In addition, if a unit deals a critical blow to destroy another unit, it will be marked as a "critical kill" with additional rewards such as extra money, experience, or even energy.

A commander also has the option of calling on an ally (when available) which is typically another player who, although not directly involved in the combat, may provide a power-up. A player can also use a stored attack gained from previous levels and battles.

Players can also pause or forfeit battles, this may be due to low energy (every attack requires energy) or for cutting losses in an unwinnable match (such as having no specialties towards the enemies units.) All units are repaired after a battle, with optional in-game repairs requiring either a support power-up, an experimental unit, or a certain amount of "empire points" (real currency).  As of January 2012, the game has required a ransom of coins or resources of varying quantities depending on the type of units in battle and the number still surviving.

Many of the power-ups can also be used to win battles with greater ease. They can be obtained by invading or helping neighbors in which the player would receive one random power-up from every level up, tasks completed from a toolbar on the left side of game screen, from the power-up factory (considering that parts have to be collected from allies to build the power-ups), and various other ways.

Survival Mode
In this mode player has to select 5 units or use the Titan to participate in a sixty-wave battle. Prizes are awarded every five waves, and elite units are awarded every 20 waves. The Epic Survival Mode is a battle against higher-ranked units, with rare units awarded every 20 levels.
Now with every 20 waves reached the player get three units.

Units

Players establish four tiers of production buildings, including shipyards, barracks, and hangars to create sea, land, and air units respectively.  After being produced, players can deploy them on their archipelago to defend their buildings from invasion. Each unit casts a radius of defense (one square radius for land units, two square radius for air units and 2.5 square radius for sea units), so an invading player targeting a building within one or more of these radii, that invader must engage and destroy those defending units successfully to begin an occupation.

There are three "theaters" of war, Land, Navy, and Air. There are no special bonuses to these theaters against each other, yet they may attack each other, and typically units will have one speciality in each theater, one weakness, and one neutral. These units are based on actual military units, such as Flying Fortress bombers, MIG-17 fighters, and Sherman tanks. When your units are destroyed in combat, they yield a small amount of coins plus one oil.

Since the release of the game, Zynga has also created "special edition units" that have varying strength levels and are only available for a set amount of time.  Some of these units are also based on existing weapons and vessels such as the USS Enterprise, but may have exaggerations in appearance to fit the cartoon-like figure of Zynga's games.  Most of these units require purchase of their "blueprints" with real-world money through Zynga game cards and other methods of payment.

Experimental units
Experimental units are units that are built with special abilities that can be used for 1-5 Element Z. Element Z is a resource that must be required in order to use those special abilities. Otherwise, experimental units can fairly attack all other invaders. These are not just the highest-costing producible units in the game (8500-25000 coins per unit), but they also use the most oil.

Titan
The Titan is the most powerful land unit that can be constructed. The unit needs to be assembled part by part and then activated by paying Titan Plates, ore, and 300,000 coins. The parts to the titan consist of miniguns, titan heads, and shoulder cannons. These can be built for greater than 4000 oil, making them the vehicles that use the most oil to produce.

Unlike most units, the Titan uses Element Z instead of energy for its attacks.

Campaign

Like other "Ville" games such as FrontierVille and CityVille, Empires & Allies has a common narrative that directs the player through the game's "story." Although Empires & Allies is an open ended game, it has a mission progression system that leads the player through features in the game, introducing new units or otherwise encouraging certain tasks, with rewards provided for completion. The game also contains a wider story arc which is progressed mainly through defeating enemy commanders on the "campaign map" which the player can access at any time. Ultimately, the player's goal is to finish the campaign and defeat "The Raven."  A second campaign was released, titled "Molten Terror", which at the time have 8 groups of islands, but only four groups of islands are released. But most recently the four other islands are introduced, following the story of the Tiki Guy's escape during the last island on the first four group of islands.

Resources

The player must additionally manage resources on their island. Resources come in six types: coins, wood, oil, ores, empire points, and energy. Coins are a general resource for purchasing most in-game buildings, and are gained through property values (much like CityVille) and certain industries such as farms (unlike other "Ville" games, food is not a resource. Farm output is directly converted into coins.) Wood is used for certain buildings and resources, and is harvested by clearing trees and building lumber mills and starting lumber contracts. Oil is used for building practically any mechanized unit, it is harvested by oil wells. Ores come in varying types, such as aluminum, copper, gold, iron, and uranium, each required for different specialty units and buildings. Ore is harvested through ore mines, trading, and defeating other units. Empire tokens are real-world currency used to speed up certain elements of the game and assist in others (such as providing an extra ally during an attack or purchasing a power-up,) they can also auto-complete missions and fill seats in government buildings. In addition, defeating AI players provides liberty bonds which are used for land-expansion, along with coins.  There are also experience points, which level up the player.

Tradable resources can be produced from lumber mills, oil derricks or mines which the player can build.  Depending on the level of advance resource selected each operates with a different production efficiency.

Honor, Infamy and Domination Points

Honor and infamy is one of Empires & Allies most defining features. Honor is produced by assisting other players, by visiting their empires or helping to defend, and is represented by a red heart. Honor improves rewards for helping players, as well as providing defensive power-ups when the player levels up in fame.

Infamy is produced by invading and looting other players, it is represented by a black heart and provides increasingly powerful offensive powers for use during combat when infamy is leveled up.

Domination points are produced by attacking and defending other players in the "World Domination" mode. The more domination points a player has, the more elite units they can build.

Decorations
Some Decorations provided bonuses to military, housing and production structures when placed near them.

Closure

On April 24, 2013, it was announced that the game would shut down along with three other games: The Ville, Dream Zoo, and Zynga City (a game which exists on Tencent). The game's closure date was announced as June 17, 2013 on May 16.

References

2011 video games
Browser-based multiplayer online games
Facebook games
Social casual games
Video games developed in the United States
Zynga